Caringbah is a suburb in Southern Sydney, in the state of New South Wales, Australia.

Caringbah once stretched from Woolooware Bay on the Georges River to Yowie Bay and Burraneer Bay on the Port Hacking estuary. A number of Caringbah localities have been declared as separate suburbs but still share the postcode 2229. These suburbs include Taren Point to the north on the Georges River, and Port Hacking, Lilli Pilli, Dolans Bay and Caringbah South, located on the Port Hacking River to the south.

History
 is an Aboriginal word from the Kumbainggar language for a pademelon wallaby. The suburb was originally called Highfield, but it is unclear whether this was a position description or whether it was named after an early resident. Caringbah was used from 1911, after the steam trams began operating between Cronulla and Sutherland.

Thomas Holt (1811–88) owned most of the land that stretched from Sutherland to Cronulla in the 1860s. Most of the area around Miranda and Caringbah was used for market gardening from the 1880s. Caringbah was still used for orchards and farming until after World War II. The railway line to Cronulla opened in 1939.

Commercial area
Caringbah features a mixture of residential, commercial and industrial areas. The commercial district is made up mostly of small businesses specialising in professional services. A large commercial and industrial area is also centred on Taren Point Road and surrounding areas. Commercial developments here include many home furnishing retailers such as Nick Scali Furniture, large retailers including Bunnings, as well as home renovation showrooms.

The main shopping centre is located close to Caringbah railway station and is centred on the intersections of President Avenue, the Kingsway and Port Hacking Road South. A small group of shops, known as Caringbah South, is located further south on Port Hacking Road South. Caringbah Library is located on Port Hacking Road South. Another small group of shops is located even further south, close to the border of Lilli Pilli. Caringbah is home to the public district Sutherland Hospital adjacent to Caringbah Ambulance Station and Kareena Private Hospital on Kareena Road.

Transport
Caringbah is a central suburb of the Sutherland Shire, considering some of the main roads intersect here. President Avenue and the Kingsway both run from Sutherland via Miranda in the west, to the popular beachside suburb of Cronulla in the east. Taren Point Road leads north to the Captain Cook Bridge, St George area and further north to the Sydney CBD.

Caringbah railway station is on the Cronulla branch of the Eastern Suburbs & Illawarra Line T4 on the Sydney Trains network.

Transdev NSW runs buses to such places as Lilli Pilli, South Cronulla, Hurstville, Sutherland, Cronulla and Dolans Bay and Transit Systems operates one school route. For full route details see Caringbah Station.

Demographics
According to the 2016 census of Population, there were 11,658 people in Caringbah.
 Aboriginal and Torres Strait Islander people made up 1.4% of the population.
 73.9% of people there were born in Australia. The next most common countries of birth were England 3.7%, New Zealand 2.2%, China 1.6%, India 1.1% and Philippines 1.0%.
 80.1% of people spoke only English at home. Other languages spoken at home included Mandarin 1.8%, Cantonese 1.3%, Greek 1.3% and Russian 0.9%. 
 The most common responses for religion were Catholic 28.9%, No Religion 26.5% and Anglican 19.6%.

Schools
There are three secondary schools and several primary schools in Caringbah.
 Caringbah Selective High School, the only academically selective secondary school in the Sutherland Shire.
 Endeavour Sports High School, one of seven selective sports secondary schools in NSW offering Targeted Sports Programs for talented athletes.
 De La Salle College, a school for boys from Year 7 to Year 10.
 Caringbah Public School (located in Caringbah South)
 Caringbah North Public School – has an opportunity class in years 5 and 6.
 Laguna Street Public School
 Our Lady of Fatima Catholic Primary School

Sport 
Caringbah is host to several sporting teams, including:

 Caringbah Redbacks FC (soccer)
 Caringbah Sports Cricket Club (cricket)
 Cronulla Caringbah Sharks JRLFC (rugby league)

Gallery

Notable People 

Mark Vincent, tenor vocalist

References

Suburbs of Sydney
Sutherland Shire